Illinois Route 156 is an east–west state road in southwestern Illinois. It runs from South Meyer Avenue & C Road in Valmeyer to just west of New Athens.

Route description 
Illinois 156 runs through rural southwestern Illinois. It is the main east–west state road through Waterloo. Illinois 156 overlaps Illinois Route 159 from Hecker north for a short distance, when 156 leaves 159 and turns back toward its eastern terminus.

History 
SBI Route 156 is the same as Illinois 156 is now. There have been no changes since 1926.

Major Intersections

References

External links 
Illinois Highway Ends: Illinois Route 156

156
Transportation in Monroe County, Illinois
Transportation in St. Clair County, Illinois